James P. Spradley (1933–1982) was a professor of Anthropology at Macalester College from 1969. Spradley  wrote or edited 20 books on ethnography and qualitative research including Participant Observation and The Ethnographic Interview (1979, Wadsworth Thomson Learning). In The Ethnographic Interview, Spradley describes 12 steps for developing an ethnographic study using ethnosemantics. This book followed his 1972 textbook (with David W. McCurdy) The Cultural Experience: Ethnography in Complex Society. He was a major figure in the development of the "new ethnography" which saw every individual as a carrier of the culture rather than simply looking to the outputs of the great artists of the time.

He died of leukemia in 1982.

Reception and impact
Spradley's work was widely used as college texts for American Studies classes in the 1970s.

In You Owe Yourself a Drunk he conducted interviews and created a "typology of the different kinds" of homeless alcoholic men. It has been called a "classic" of "good systemic ethnography".

Spradley's book Deaf Like Me, written with his brother Tom, records the experience of Tom's daughter Lynn who was born deaf after her mother contracted the German measles. The book follows the family from the first fears that their child may be deformed, the relief of having a healthy baby girl, the anguish at realizing she was deaf and the years of treatment. Spradley provides a deep and meaningful insight into what its like to have a deaf child. At the time, many doctors encouraged a purely oral environment. Lynn's parents explain that their daughters "native language" was not English but sign language. Most of the book explains what led to this revelation.

Types of analysis 
Spradley describes ethnography as different from deductive types of social research in that the five steps of ethnographic research—selecting a problem, collecting data, analyzing data, formulating hypotheses, and writing—all happen simultaneously (p. 93-94).

In The Ethnographic Interview, Spradley describes four types of ethnographic analysis that basically build on each other. The first type of analysis is domain analysis, which is “a search for the larger units of cultural knowledge” (p. 94). The other kinds of analysis are taxonomy analysis, componential analysis, and theme analysis.

Works
 1970 You Owe Yourself a Drunk: An Ethnography of Urban Nomads. Boston: Little Brown. (Reissued Long Grove, IL: Waveland Press, 2000)
 1972 The Cultural Experience: Ethnography in Complex Society (with David W. McCurdy). (Second Edition [also with Dianna J. Shandy] published Long Grove, IL: Waveland Press, 2005)
 1972 Culture and Cognition: Rules, Maps and Plans. San Francisco: Chandler.
 1975 The Cocktail Waitress: Woman's Work in a Man's World (with Brenda J. Mann). New York: Wiley. (Reissued Long Grove, IL: Waveland Press, 2008)
 1976 Ethics and Anthropology: Dilemmas in Fieldwork (with Michael A. Rynkiewich). New York: Wiley.
 1979 Deaf Like Me (with Thomas Spradley). New York: Random House (Reissued Gallaudet University Press: Washington, DC, 1987)
 1979 The Ethnographic Interview. Belmont, CA: Wadsworth. (Reissued Long Grove, IL: Waveland Press, 2016)
 1980 Participant Observation. New York: Holt, Rinehart and Winston. (Reissued Long Grove, IL: Waveland Press, 2016)
 1980 Anthropology: The Cultural Perspective (with David W. McCurdy). (Reissued Long Grove, IL: Waveland Press 1989)

References

Macalester College faculty
1934 births
1982 deaths
Deaths from leukemia
20th-century American anthropologists